Lanner and Stithians was an electoral division of Cornwall in the United Kingdom which returned one member to sit on Cornwall Council between 2013 and 2021. It was abolished at the 2021 local elections, being succeeded by Lanner, Stithians and Gwennap.

Councillors

Extent
Lanner and Stithians represented the villages of Longdowns, Stithians and Lanner, and the hamlets of Herniss, Hendra, Tresevern Croft, Penhalurick. The hamlet of Treviskey was shared with the Carharrack, Gwennap and St Day division. The division covered 2,340 hectares in total.

Election results

2017 election

2013 election

References

Electoral divisions of Cornwall Council